Brachistinae is a subfamily of braconid wasps in the family Braconidae.

The genera of Brachistinae were formerly classified under the subfamily Blacinae, which became the tribe Blacini, and tribes Diospilini, Brulleiini and Brachistini of the subfamily Helconinae.

Genera
The genera of the subfamily Brachistinae include:

 Aspicolpus Wesmael, 1838 c g
 Aspigonus Wesmael, 1835 c g
 Baeacis Förster, 1878 c g
 Blacometeorus Tobias, 1976 c g
 Blacus Nees von Esenbeck, 1818 c g b
 Brulleia Szépligeti, 1904 c g
 Diospilus Haliday, 1833 c g b
 Dyscoletes Westwood, 1840 c g
 Eubazus Nees von Esenbeck, 1812 c g b
 Foersteria Szépligeti, 1896 i c g
 Nipponocolpus Belokobylskij & Fujie, 2017
 Parabrulleia van Achterberg, 1983 c g
 Schizoprymnus Förster, 1862 c g b
 Taphaeus Wesmael, 1835 c g
 Triaspis Haliday, 1838 c g b
 Vadumasonium Kammerer, 2006 c g
 Xyeloblacus van Achterberg, 1997 c g

Data sources: i = ITIS, c = Catalogue of Life, g = GBIF, b = Bugguide.net

References

External links

 

Parasitic wasps